Tsai Chin is a pop and folk singer from Taiwan. Tsai sings in both Mandarin Chinese and Taiwanese Hokkien and is known for her rich, magnetic vocals. Because of this, she is also known as the "Patti Page of Taiwan".

Music career
Tsai's hits include "Forgotten Times" (《被遺忘的時光》), "Just Like Your Tenderness" (《恰似你的温柔》), "The Last Night" (《最後一夜》), "Reading You" (《讀你》) and "The Spirit of Your Eyes" (《你的眼神》). The peak of her popularity in Taiwan was from the late 1970s to the mid-1990s but she remains popular in Mainland China.

Tsai's albums Tsai Chin Live 2007 and Golden Voice was recognized with a "Top-10-Selling Mandarin Albums of the Year" award at the 2007 IFPI Hong Kong Album Sales Awards, presented by the Hong Kong branch of IFPI.

Personal life
Tsai was married to Taiwanese director Edward Yang from 1985 to 1995. Tsai was featured alongside Hou Hsiao-Hsien in Yang's 1985 film Taipei Story.

Discography

In popular culture
Tsai's song "Forgotten Times" (《被遺忘的時光》) features prominently in the 2002 hit Hong Kong film Infernal Affairs as a recurring element of its storyline, and also in its sequels. As well as serving to elucidate the theme of the films, the song plays an important plot function in chronologically connecting various elements of the story.

References

External links

 

1957 births
Living people
Musicians from Kaohsiung
Taiwanese film actresses
Taiwanese Mandopop singers
Actresses from Kaohsiung
20th-century Taiwanese women singers
21st-century Taiwanese women singers